The District of Leiria is a district located in Centro region of Portugal, divided between the traditional provinces of Beira Litoral and Estremadura. It borders on the north with district of Coimbra, on the east with district of Castelo Branco and with district of Santarém, on the south with district of Lisbon and on the west with the ocean Atlantic. The district capital is the city of Leiria.

Municipalities

Summary of votes and seats won 1976-2022

|- class="unsortable"
!rowspan=2|Parties!!%!!S!!%!!S!!%!!S!!%!!S!!%!!S!!%!!S!!%!!S!!%!!S!!%!!S!!%!!S!!%!!S!!%!!S!!%!!S!!%!!S!!%!!S!!%!!S
|- class="unsortable" style="text-align:center;"
!colspan=2 | 1976
!colspan=2 | 1979
!colspan=2 | 1980
!colspan=2 | 1983
!colspan=2 | 1985
!colspan=2 | 1987
!colspan=2 | 1991
!colspan=2 | 1995
!colspan=2 | 1999
!colspan=2 | 2002
!colspan=2 | 2005
!colspan=2 | 2009
!colspan=2 | 2011
!colspan=2 | 2015
!colspan=2 | 2019
!colspan=2 | 2022
|-
| align="left"| PS || 31.1|| 4 || 23.2 || 3 ||22.7 || 3 || 32.7 || 4 || 19.6 || 2 || 18.7 || 2 || 23.0 || 3 || 36.7 || 4  || 36.8 || 4 || 29.5 || 3 || 35.6 || 4 || 30.1 || 4 || 20.7 || 3 || 24.8 || 3 || 31.1 || 4 || style="background:#FF66FF;"|35.7 || style="background:#FF66FF;"|5
|-
| align="left"| PSD || style="background:#f90;"|31.2 || style="background:#f90;"|4 || align=center colspan=4 rowspan=2|In AD || style="background:#f90;"|35.6 || style="background:#f90;"|4 || style="background:#f90;"|38.6 || style="background:#f90;"|5 || style="background:#f90;"|60.8 || style="background:#f90;"|9 || style="background:#f90;"|61.2 || style="background:#f90;"|7 || style="background:#f90;"|43.3 || style="background:#f90;"|5 || style="background:#f90;"|42.6|| style="background:#f90;"|5 || style="background:#f90;"|50.8 || style="background:#f90;"|6 || style="background:#f90;"|39.8 || style="background:#f90;"|5 || style="background:#f90;"|34.9 || style="background:#f90;"|4 || style="background:#f90;"|47.0 || style="background:#f90;"|6 || align=center colspan=2 rowspan=2|In PàF || style="background:#f90;"|33.5 || style="background:#f90;"|5 || 34.7 || 4
|-
| align="left"| CDS-PP || 19.4 || 2 || 16.2 || 2 || 12.2 || 1 || 6.0 ||  || 4.8 ||  || 11.4 || 1 || 9.9 || 1 || 9.8 || 1 || 8.9 || 1 || 12.6 || 1 || 12.8 || 1 || 5.3 ||  || 2.1 || 
|-
| align="left"| PCP/APU/CDU || 7.3 || 1 || 10.9|| 1 || 9.7 || 1 || 9.5 || 1 || 7.9 || 1 || 5.9 ||  || 4.5 ||  || 4.5 ||  || 5.3 ||  || 4.1 ||  || 4.6 ||  || 5.1 ||  || 5.0 ||  || 5.1 ||  || 4.3 ||  || 3.1 || 
|-
| align="left"| AD || colspan=2| || style="background:#0ff;"|56.2 || style="background:#0ff;"|7 || style="background:#0ff;"|59.8 || style="background:#0ff;"|7 || colspan=26|
|-
| align="left"| PRD || colspan=8| || 15.3 || 2 || 3.0 ||  || colspan=20|
|-
| align="left"| BE || colspan=16| || 1.7 ||  || 2.2 ||  || 5.5 ||  || 9.5 || 1 || 5.1 ||  || 9.7 || 1 || 9.4 || 1 || 4.5 || 
|-
| align="left"| PàF || colspan=26| || style="background:#00AAAA;"|48.4 || style="background:#00AAAA;"|6 || colspan=4|
|-
| align="left"| CHEGA || colspan=28| || 1.5 ||  || 8.0 || 1
|-
! Total seats || colspan=12|11 || colspan=20|10
|-
! colspan="33"|Source: Comissão Nacional de Eleições
|}

See also
 Casal de São Simão, a village in the district of Leiria

 
Districts of Portugal